The Florida Mental Health Act of 1971 (Florida Statute 394.451-394.47891 [2009 rev.]), commonly known as the "Baker Act", allows the involuntary institutionalization and examination of an individual.

The Baker Act allows for involuntary examination (what some call emergency or involuntary commitment),  which can be initiated by judges, law enforcement officials, physicians, or mental health professionals and close friends and relatives.  There must be evidence that the person:

 possibly has a mental illness.
 is in danger of becoming a harm to self or harm to others, or is self-neglectful.

Both of these are defined in the Baker Act.

Examinations may last up to 72 hours after a person is deemed medically stable and occur in over 100 Florida Department of Children and Families-designated receiving facilities statewide.

There are many possible outcomes following examination of the patient.  These include the release of the individual to the community (or other community placement), a petition for involuntary inpatient placement (often called civil commitment), involuntary outpatient placement (what some call outpatient commitment or assisted treatment orders), or voluntary treatment (if the person is competent to consent to voluntary treatment and consents to voluntary treatment).  The involuntary outpatient placement language in the Baker Act took effect as part of the Baker Act reform in 2005.

The legislation was nicknamed the "Baker Act" after Florida Democratic state representative from Miami, Maxine Baker, who served from 1963 to 1972. She had a strong interest in mental health issues, served as chair of the House Committee on Mental Health, and was the sponsor of the bill.

The nickname has led to the term "Baker Act" as a transitive verb, and "Baker Acted" as a passive-voice verb, for invoking the Act to force an individual's commitment. Although the Baker Act is a statute only for the state of Florida, use of "Baker Acting" as a verb has become prevalent as a slang term for involuntary commitment in other regions of the United States.

Criteria for involuntary examination
Specific criteria must be met in order to initiate involuntary examination. Among those criteria are the following elements, which do not individually qualify an individual as meeting the criteria:

 Reason to believe that the person has a mental illness;
 The person refuses voluntary examination;
 The person is unable to determine whether examination is necessary.

The decisive criterion, as stated in the statute, mentions a substantial likelihood that without care or treatment the person will cause serious bodily harm in the near future. Criteria are not met simply because a person has a mental illness, appears to have mental problems, takes psychiatric medication, has an emotional outburst, or refuses voluntary examination. Furthermore, if there are family members or friends that will help prevent any potential and present threat of substantial harm, the criteria for involuntary examination are also not met.

The following are not included under this act:
 Developmental disability
 Intoxication
 Conditions manifested only by antisocial behavior
 Conditions manifested only by substance abuse impairment

"Substantial likelihood" must involve evidence of recent behavior to justify the substantial likelihood of serious bodily harm in the near future. Moments in the past, when an individual may have considered harming themselves or another, do not qualify the individual as meeting the criteria.

Reception 
An editorial in the Tampa Bay Times wrote "that crisis stabilization is a Band-Aid solution to emotional problems" and the Act should be reformed to allow public defenders to have access to the patient's medical records and ongoing counseling and outpatient mental health treatment should be provided to the patient.

See also

 5150 (involuntary psychiatric hold), a section of the California Welfare and Institutions Code
 Laura's Law
 Kendra's Law
 Marchman Act

References
Notes

External links
 Text of the Baker Act
 Baker Act Reporting Center
 

Health in Florida
Mental health law in the United States
Forensic psychology
Florida law
1971 in law
1971 in Florida
Involuntary commitment